Citizen Alliance was a political coalition in Iraq led by Ammar al-Hakim, President of the Islamic Supreme Council of Iraq, from 2014 to 2017. Most of its MPs joined the National Wisdom Movement when this new party was launched in 2017 by Ammar al-Hakim.

History
Al-Muwatin was a broad alliance of 23 various Iraqi, primarily Shia, political entities that formed a coalition for the 2014 Iraqi parliamentary election. It was announced by its leader Ammar al-Hakim in March 2014.

Members of the coalition
Islamic Supreme Council of Iraq – led by Ammar al-Hakim
Al-Mehraab Martyr List
Iraqi National Congress – led by Ahmed Chalabi
Tayyar Bada'na – led by Jawad al Boulani

2014 parliamentary elections
Al-Muwatin won 29 seats in the 2014 Iraqi Parliament as follows:
Babil Governorate – 3 seats
Baghdad Governorate – 5 seats
Basra Governorate – 6 seats
Dhi Qar Governorate – 4 seats
Diyala Governorate – 1 seat
Karbala Governorate – 1 seat
Maysan Governorate – 2 seats
Muthanna Governorate – 2 seats
Najaf Governorate – 2 seats
Al-Qādisiyyah Governorate – 1 seat
Wasit Governorate – 2 seats
Total – 29 seats out of 328 seats

See also
Islamic Supreme Council of Iraq
Al-Mehraab Martyr List

References

Defunct political party alliances in Iraq
Shia Islamic political parties